Below is a list of notable venture capital firms.

Assets under management
Shown below are the largest venture capital firms ranked by Assets Under Management.

Capital raised
Data is for capital raised between January 1, 2017, and June 30, 2022. Data is from Venture Capital Journal in 2022.

Deal flow
Shown below are the largest venture capital firms by deal flow at different growth stages in 2022.

Angel and seed

Early stage

Late stage

List

Americas

  Accel
  Advanced Technology Ventures
  Almaz Capital
  Andreessen Horowitz
  ARCH Venture Partners
  Atlas Venture
  August Capital
  Austin Ventures
  Azure Capital Partners
  Bain Capital Ventures
  Battery Ventures
  Benchmark Capital
  Bessemer Venture Partners
  Binary Capital
  Blumberg Capital
  CapitalG
  Charles River Ventures
  Clearstone Venture Partners
  Columbus Nova
  Contrary
  Cottonwood Technology Fund
  Crosslink Capital
  CrunchFund
  DAG Ventures
  DCM Ventures
  Draper Fisher Jurvetson
  Founders Circle Capital
  ff Venture Capital
  First Round Capital
  FirstMark Capital
  Foundation Capital
  Founders Fund
  Galen Partners
  GE Ventures
  GGV Capital
  Granite Ventures
  Greycroft
  Greylock Partners
  Growthworks
  GV
  Harris & Harris Group
  Highland Capital Partners
  IDG Ventures
  Index Ventures
  Initialized Capital
  In-Q-Tel
  Insight Partners
  Institutional Venture Partners
  Intel Capital
  Intellectual Ventures
  Khosla Ventures
  Kleiner Perkins
  Lightbank
  Lighter Capital
  Lightspeed Venture Partners
  Lux Capital
  Matrix Partners
  Maveron
  Mayfield Fund
  Menlo Ventures
  Meritech Capital Partners
  Morgenthaler Ventures
  New Enterprise Associates
  Norwest Venture Partners
  Oak Investment Partners
  Optimize Capital Markets
  Polaris Partners
  Qualcomm Ventures
  Radius Ventures
  Redpoint Ventures
  Renewal2
  Revolution LLC
  Rho Ventures
  Rothenberg Ventures
  RRE Ventures
  Scale Venture Partners
  Sequoia Capital
  Sevin Rosen Funds
  Social Capital
  Sofinnova Ventures
  SoftTech VC
  SOSV
  Spark Capital
  TCV
  Tenaya Capital
  Third Rock Ventures
  Thrive Capital
  Tiger Global Management
  U.S. Venture Partners
  Union Square Ventures
  Venrock
  Votorantim Novos Negócios

EMEA

  Abingworth
  Atomico Ventures
  Balderton Capital
  BGF
  Cottonwood Technology Fund
  DN Capital
  Draper Esprit
  EQT Ventures
  Genesis Partners
  German Startups Group
  HealthCap
  High-Tech Gründerfonds
  Hydra Ventures
  Impact X
  Industrifonden
  IIDF
  Iona Capital
  Iris Capital
  Israel Cleantech Ventures
  Jerusalem Venture Partners
  Mercia Fund Management
  Newfund
  Nova Founders Capital
  Oxford Sciences Innovation
  Pitango
  Porton Group
  Seedcamp
  SyndicateRoom
  Target Partners
  TBG AG
  Terra Venture Partners
  The Craftory
  Viola Ventures
  Wellington Partners Venture Capital
  YL Ventures

Asia

  5Y Capital
  Antler
  BANSEA
  Chiratae Ventures
  Convergence Ventures
  Cowin Capital
  DST Global
  Gaorong Capital
  Horizons Ventures
  IDG Capital
  JAFCO
  Mizuho Capital
  Northern Light Venture Capital
  Qiming Venture Partners
  Quest Ventures
  Shanghai Venture Capital Co.
  Shenzhen Capital Group
  Shunwei Capital
  Sinovation Ventures
  SoftBank Vision Fund
  Source Code Capital
  STIC Investments
  Vertex Holdings
  ZhenFund

See also
Angel investor
Comparison of crowdfunding services
List of hedge funds

References

External links 
US State-by-state comparison of per capita venture capital spending

Lists of financial services companies